Aviyal is a 2022 Indian Malayalam-language film, written and directed by Shanil, who had earlier co-directed Philips and the Monkey Pen along with Rojin Thomas. The film produced by Sujith Surendran, starring Joju George and Anaswara Rajan in lead roles of father and daughter respectively was released with mixed reviews.

Actor Sirajudeen Nazir plays the central character and the film was shot for a period of over two years, as the actors had to alter their physical appearance.

Premise 
Aviyal tells the story of Krishnan, a music-obsessed man born in Kannur and his four stages—childhood, adolescence, youth and old age of life.

Cast 

Joju George as Krishnan
Anaswara Rajan
Sirajudeen Nazir as Young Krishnan
Ketaki Narayan
Athmiya Rajan as Nithula
Anjali Nair
Dain Davis
Sanju Sanichen
Shravan Satya
Swathi
Prasanth Alexander
Shafeer Khan
Shivadas
Unni Shivapal
Vishnu Govindhan
Zinil Zainudeen
Subeesh Sudhi

Production 
Director Shanil, who had earlier co-directed Philips and the Monkey Pen was supported by the producer Sujith Surendran for the coming of age film, his third directorial. Actors Joju George and Anaswara Rajan were signed to play the lead roles. The principal photography began on 14 January 2020, but the film was shot for a period of over 2 years as the film makers wanted the actors to alter their physical appearance according to their respective characters. Cinematographers Sudeep Elamon, Jimshi Khalid, Ravi K Chandran and Gikku Jacob Peter worked in each schedule at different locations of Kannur, Goa and Kodaikanal.

Release
After multiple postponements, the film was released on 7 April 2022. The film was digitally released on Amazon prime  on 20 May 2022.

Critical Response
S.R.Praveen of The Hindu mentioned that the director wrote some convincing initial portions, but makes a patchy final product. Deepa Soman of The Times of India rated the film with 3/5 stars, stating that the film was shot over a few years, deserves appreciation for the rarely attempted, but patience-testing method of filmmaking, that makes the narration close to ordinary life, due to the sheer passage of time captured in the film. Sajin Shrijith of Cinema Express rated the film with 2.5/5 stars, stated that the film has an excellent first half, but a huge let down by some familiar and predictable scenes later on. The News Minute rated the film with 2.5/5 stars, wrote that the film, though appreciable in parts, has a lot to patch up in storytelling, performances and music, that is often irritating.

References

External links 
 

2020s Malayalam-language films
2022 films
Indian coming-of-age films
Films shot in Kannur
2020s coming-of-age drama films
2022 drama films